English billiards, called simply billiards in the United Kingdom and in many former British colonies, is a cue sport that combines the aspects of carom billiards and pool. Two  (one white and one yellow) and a red  are used. Each player or team uses a different cue ball.

History
English billiards originated in England, and was originally called the winning and losing carambole game, folding in the names of three predecessor games, the winning game, the losing game, and an early form of carom billiards that combined to form it.

The winning game was played with two white balls, and was a 12- contest. To start, the player who could strike a ball at one end of the table and get the ball to come to rest nearest the opposite cushion without lying against it earned the right to shoot for points first. This is the origin of the modern custom of "" (or ""). 

A player who pocketed the opponent's ball scored two points, as is still the case in modern billiards. These rules continued to exist in English billiards until 1983, when a standard of two points for all fouls was introduced.

"" and "" are terms still mentioned in the official rules for these two fundamental shot types, although "" and "" have become the usual terms for them in British English.

In the 1700s, the carom game added a red  to the two white cue balls, and dispensed with the pockets. This ball was adopted into the English game, which retained the pockets, and the goal was to cannon off both the red and the opponent's ball on a single shot, earning 2 points. This influence on the English game appears to have come about through the popularity of French tables in English coffee houses; London alone had over two thousand such establishments in the early 18th century. One period advertisement read: "A very good French Billiard Table, little the worse for wearing, full size, with all the materials fit for French or English play".

The three ancestral games had their British heyday in the 1770s, but had combined into English billiards, with a 16-point score total, by approximately 1800.

There are a number of pocket billiard games directly descended from English billiards, including bull dog, scratch pool, thirty-one pool and thirty-eight. The last of these gave rise to the more well-known game cowboy pool. English Billiards was virtually unknown in the United States until 1913, when Melbourn Inman visited the US and played the game against Willie Hoppe. By 1915 the game had become rather popular, prompting American billiard hall proprietors of the period to increase the number of English-style tables in their establishments. It also became favored in British colonies; the game's longest-running champion was an Australian, Walter Lindrum, who held the World Professional Billiards Championship from 1933 until his retirement in 1950. The game remains popular in the UK, although it has been eclipsed by snooker.

As a sport
The first governing body of the game, the Billiards Association, was formed in the UK in 1885, a period that saw a number of sporting bodies founded across the British sporting world. By the mid-20th century, the principal sanctioning body was the Billiards Association and Control Council (later the Billiards and Snooker Control Council), formed in 1919 by an amalgamation of the  Billiards Association and the Billiards Control Club (founded in 1908).

In the 19th century and up through the mid-1950s, a common way for championship titles to change hands was by a challenge match. A challenge was issued to a championship title holder accompanied by  money held by a third party. Up until the first organised professional tournament in 1870, all English billiards champions were decided by challenge.

The first champion was Jonathan Kentfield, who held the title from 1820 to 1849, losing it to John Roberts Sr. after Kentfield refused his challenge. Roberts's 21-year reign lasted until he lost to William Cook in 1870. That year was also the first in which an English billiards challenge match was held in the United States.

From 1870 to 1983 the champions were: John Roberts Jr., (1870, 1871, 1875–77, 1885); Joseph Bennett, (1870, 1880–81); Charles Dawson, (1899–1900, 1901, 1903); H. W. Stevenson, (1901, 1909–11); Melbourne Inman, (1908–09, 1912–19); Willie Smith, (1920, 1923); Tom Newman, (1921–22, 1924–27); Joe Davis, (1928–32); Walter Lindrum, (1933–50); Clark McConachy, (1951-68); Rex Williams, (1968–76, 1982–83); and Fred Davis, (1980).

A "Women's Billiard Association" was formed in Britain in 1931. One of the founders was Teresa Billington-Greig who had been a leading suffragette and was then married to a billiard ball manufacturer.

Over the course of the 20th century, English billiards was largely superseded as the favoured cue sport in the United Kingdom by snooker and the rise of English-style eight-ball pool. The game does retain some popularity amongst snooker players, who can use the same equipment for both games and play the game to practise ball control.

Rules

Balls and table

There are three balls. They are the same size as snooker balls (52.5 mm or  in with a tolerance of 0.05 mm) and they must weigh the same to a tolerance of 0.5 g within a set.

The balls are designated as:
 Yellow – the cue ball for player 2, and an object ball for player 1 (historically a white ball with spots was used)
 Red – an object ball for both players

The billiard table used has the same dimensions as in snooker, and in many venues, both games are played on the same equipment. The playing area of a standard tournament table measures 11 feet 8 inches by 5 ft 10 in (3.569 m by 1.778 m) with a tolerance of  inch (1.26 cm) in both directions, though smaller ones, down to half size, are often found in snooker halls, pubs and home billiard rooms.

Beginning the game

The player who gets their ball closer to the baulk cushion can now choose which cue ball they want to use during the game and to break or let the opponent break.

The other cue ball remains off the table until the opponent's first turn, when they play in hand from the "D".

The idea is to leave the balls  by creating either a double baulk (both object balls in baulk), or the red in baulk with the cue-ball  to the top-side cushion.

Scoring

Points are awarded as follows:

  – striking the cue ball so that it hits, in any order, the other cue ball and the red ball on the same shot: 2 points.
  ( in snooker terms) – striking one's cue ball so that it hits another ball and then enters a pocket: 3 points if the red ball was hit first; 2 points if the other cue ball was hit first; 2 points if the red and the other cue ball are hit simultaneously.

Combinations of the above may all be scored on the same shot. The most that can be scored in a single shot is therefore 10 – the red and the other cue ball are both potted via a cannon (the red must be struck first), and the cue ball is also potted, making a losing hazard off the red.

The winner is determined by a player reaching a fixed number of points set at the start of the game, or by which player is leading at the end of a timed game.

Other rules
If both the middle and pyramid spots are occupied, it goes back on the spot. When potted from the middle or pyramid spot, it returns to the spot at the top of the table.

After a losing hazard, play continues in-hand from the "D". When playing from in-hand, a striker must touch a ball or cushion out of baulk before striking a ball in baulk.

If playing in-hand and all balls on the table are in baulk, and contact is not made with any ball, this is a miss; 2 points are awarded to the opponent, who must play from where the balls have come to rest.

If an opponent's cue ball is potted, it remains off the table until it is that opponent's turn to play, when it is returned to that player, who may play it in-hand from the "D". There is one exception to this rule: only 15 hazards in a row may be played, after which a cannon is needed to continue the break. If only the red ball is on the table at the start of the break (meaning a cannon cannot be made), then after 15 hazards the opponent's ball must be placed on the "brown spot". It becomes a "line ball" and may not be played directly from baulk.

If the cue ball is touching an object ball, then the balls must be respotted: red on its spot and opponent's ball in the centre spot, with the striker to play from in-hand.

Matches held under professional regulations include a rule forcing the player to execute a shot in a way to have his cue ball cross the baulk line, heading towards the baulk cushion, once between 80 and 99 points in every 100 in a running break.

Fouls
If a foul occurs, two points are awarded to the opposing player who has the choice of playing from where the balls lie or they can be respotted.

There are a few different ways a foul can occur, by:
Playing/Striking the opponent's cue ball or Red object ball
Making any ball jump off the table
Failing to make contact between one's cue ball and at least one object ball (unless double baulked)
A double-hit or push shot
Jumping one's cue ball over an object ball
Playing a 16th consecutive hazard or 76th consecutive cannon
When in-hand, not hitting an object ball or cushion out of baulk before hitting a ball in baulk.

See also
 English Amateur Billiards Championship
 International Billiards and Snooker Federation
 IBSF World Billiards Championship
 World Professional Billiards and Snooker Association

Notes

References

 

 Copied from the Rochester Democrat, which published the article on 18 January 1885.

External links

  (World Billiards Official website)
 Event results and Rankings
 
 Official Rules of the Games of Snooker and English Billiards Published by WPBSA, revised May 2022

 
Billiards